Beacon Academy (formerly Beacon Community College) is a coeducational secondary school and sixth form located in Crowborough in the English county of East Sussex.

The school converted to academy status in April 2012. It was previously a community school administered by East Sussex County Council. Today, the school is sponsored by the MARK Education Trust.

Beacon Academy offers GCSEs and BTECs as programmes of study for pupils, while students in the sixth form have the option to study from a range of A Levels and further BTECs.

References

External links
Beacon Academy official website

Secondary schools in East Sussex
Academies in East Sussex
Crowborough